The Gamma Ray Spectrometer (GRS) is a gamma-ray spectrometer on the 2001 Mars Odyssey spacecraft, a space probe orbiting the planet Mars since 2001. Part of NASA's Mars Surveyor 2001 program, it returns geological data about Mars's surface such as identifying elements and the location of water. It is maintained by the Lunar and Planetary Laboratory at the University of Arizona in the United States.  This instrument has mapped the distribution surface hydrogen, thought to trace water in the surface layer of Martian soil.

GRS specifications

The Gamma Ray Spectrometer weighs  and uses 32 watts of power. Along with its cooler, it measures . The detector is a photodiode made of a  germanium crystal, reverse biased to about 3 kilovolts, mounted at the end of a  boom to minimize interferences from the gamma radiation produced by the spacecraft itself.

The high-energy neutron detector measures .

References

External links
 Mars Odyssey GRS instrument site  at the University of Arizona

2001 Mars Odyssey
Spectrometers
Spacecraft instruments